Thelymitra latifolia is a species of orchid in the family Orchidaceae and is endemic to South Australia. It has a single broad, flat, dark green and reddish leaf and up to eight blue to mauve flowers which only open on warm, humid days.

Description
The lobe on the top of the anther is tube-shaped, gently curved and mostly yellow with a yellow tip. The side lobes curve upwards and forwards with untidy tufts of white hairs near their ends. The flowers open on warm, humid days. Flowering occurs from mid-September to early November, starting in the northern part of the range.

Taxonomy and naming
Thelymitra latifolia was first formally described in 2010 by Robert Bates from a specimen he collected near Lobethal in 2007. The description was published in the Journal of the Adelaide Botanic Garden. The specific epithet (latifolia) is derived from the Latin words latus meaning "broad" or "wide" and folia meaning "leaves", referring to the broad, flat leaves of this species.

Distribution and habitat
This sun orchid grows in woodland, sometimes near swamps and occurs from the southern Flinders Ranges and south to the Mount Lofty Ranges and the far south-east of South Australia.

References

latifolia
Endemic orchids of Australia
Orchids of South Australia
Plants described in 2010